Arturo del Rosario (born 12 May 1953) is a Filipino weightlifter. He competed at the 1972 Summer Olympics and the 1976 Summer Olympics.

References

External links
 

1953 births
Living people
Filipino male weightlifters
Olympic weightlifters of the Philippines
Weightlifters at the 1972 Summer Olympics
Weightlifters at the 1976 Summer Olympics
Place of birth missing (living people)
Weightlifters at the 1974 Asian Games
Asian Games competitors for the Philippines
20th-century Filipino people